Darkness Within 2: The Dark Lineage is a 2010 first-person adventure horror thriller video game developed by Zoetrope Interactive and published by Iceberg Interactive. A sequel to Darkness Within: In Pursuit of Loath Nolder, the game is part of a series of adventure games inspired by famous horror writer H.P. Lovecraft.

Players again take the role of police detective Howard Loreid, who suffered from the paranormal happenings around him in the first game. Now, Howard discovers that his own horrible past is connected with the madness that is about to swallow him. Unlike its predecessor, which utilized a traditional Myst style of movement, this game uses a first-person perspective similar to that of most first-person shooters.

Darkness Within 2: The Dark Lineage Director’s Cut Edition was republished on December 5 on Steam with enhanced graphics and some more additions. The official soundtrack featuring 29 tracks (69 minutes) was also released as a DLC on November 3, 2015.

External links
 Darkness Within 2 official website
 Debut Teaser from GameTrailers.com
 Announcement
 Darkness Within 2 Demo

References 

2010 video games
Adventure games
Cthulhu Mythos video games
First-person adventure games
Horror video games
Single-player video games
Video game sequels
Video games developed in Turkey
Windows games
Windows-only games
Iceberg Interactive games